Laurie Fowler (born 29 December 1951) is a former Australian rules footballer who played for Richmond and Melbourne in the Victorian Football League (VFL).

After finishing runner-up in the senior best and fairest count as a 16-year-old at Oakleigh Districts, Fowler was zoned to Richmond. Working his way up from the thirds side, Fowler made his senior VFL debut in 1971 and soon became recognised as a tough and courageous defender. He will be best remembered as the player who crashed into Carlton captain-coach John Nicholls at the start of the 1973 VFL Grand Final. The collision severely impacted Nicholls and helped Richmond avenge their loss to Carlton in the previous year's Grand Final.

Richmond won the premiership again in 1974, but Fowler quit after he was omitted from the team. The Tigers considered Fowler's senior options to be limited and sold him to Melbourne, the club Fowler had supported as a child, for $15,000 (equivalent to over $100,000 in 2009). Fowler made an instant impact with the struggling Demons, winning the Keith 'Bluey' Truscott Medal for the best and fairest player at the club in his first season. Although primarily a back-pocket player, Melbourne coach Bob Skilton also used Fowler as a ruck-rover to help cover for Greg Wells' lack of defensive skills in the midfield. In 1976, Melbourne narrowly missed out on the finals after Carlton drew with Footscray in the final round of the home-and-away season. Fowler was again among Melbourne's best players, finishing runner-up to Wells in the Keith Truscott Medal count.

Skilton was replaced as coach by former premiership player Dennis Jones at the end of the 1977 VFL season, but Melbourne's fortunes did not improve and they finished last in 1978. During that season, Fowler had to be talked out of retirement after being relegated to the Reserves, and then quit for a brief time in May after being substituted against North Melbourne. Despite receiving offers from a number of top clubs at the time, Fowler returned to Melbourne just days later and reconciled. Jones was sacked at the end of the season and Carl Ditterich returned as captain-coach.

Although Melbourne did not fare much better under Ditterich, Fowler continued to stand out, winning successive Keith Truscott Medals in 1979 and 1980 and representing Victoria at interstate level in 1980 and 1981.

Fowler walked out on Melbourne after contract negotiations failed before the start of the 1982 VFL season. Instead, he spent the season in the Victorian Football Association (VFA) with Waverley. He then became captain-coach of  fellow VFA club Springvale, leading them to the Second Division flag in 1983.

Playing statistics

|- style="background-color: #EAEAEA"
! scope="row" style="text-align:center" | 1971
|style="text-align:center;"|
| 45 || 1 || 0 || 1 || 1 || 0 || 1 || 0 ||  || 0.0 || 1.0 || 1.0 || 0.0 || 1.0 || 0.0 || 
|-
! scope="row" style="text-align:center" | 1972
|style="text-align:center;"|
| 11 || 11 || 0 || 0 || 108 || 12 || 120 || 32 ||  || 0.0 || 0.0 || 9.8 || 1.1 || 10.9 || 2.9 || 
|- style="background:#eaeaea;"
! scope="row" style="text-align:center;" | 1973
|style="text-align:center;"|
| 11 || 22 || 7 || 3 || 181 || 19 || 200 || 64 ||  || 0.3 || 0.1 || 8.2 || 0.9 || 9.1 || 2.9 || 
|-
! scope="row" style="text-align:center" | 1974
|style="text-align:center;"|
| 11 || 15 || 0 || 0 || 136 || 19 || 155 || 38 ||  || 0.0 || 0.0 || 9.1 || 1.3 || 10.3 || 2.5 || 
|- style="background:#eaeaea;"
! scope="row" style="text-align:center" | 1975
|style="text-align:center;"|
| 9 || 22 || 0 || 2 || 312 || 28 || 340 || 89 ||  || 0.0 || 0.1 || 14.9 || 1.3 || 16.2 || 4.2 || 
|-
! scope="row" style="text-align:center" | 1976
|style="text-align:center;"|
| 9 || 22 || 4 || 6 || 329 || 68 || 397 || 90 ||  || 0.2 || 0.3 || 15.0 || 3.1 || 18.0 || 4.1 || 
|- style="background:#eaeaea;"
! scope="row" style="text-align:center" | 1977
|style="text-align:center;"|
| 9 || 17 || 12 || 16 || 273 || 60 || 333 || 57 ||  || 0.7 || 1.0 || 16.1 || 3.5 || 19.6 || 3.4 || 
|-
! scope="row" style="text-align:center" | 1978
|style="text-align:center;"|
| 9 || 15 || 1 || 1 || 199 || 29 || 228 || 44 ||  || 0.1 || 0.1 || 13.3 || 1.9 || 15.2 || 2.9 || 
|- style="background:#eaeaea;"
! scope="row" style="text-align:center" | 1979
|style="text-align:center;"|
| 9 || 21 || 0 || 0 || 319 || 87 || 406 || 100 ||  || 0.0 || 0.0 || 15.2 || 4.1 || 19.3 || 4.8 || 
|-
! scope="row" style="text-align:center" | 1980
|style="text-align:center;"|
| 9 || 21 || 1 || 0 || 275 || 92 || 367 || 86 ||  || 0.0 || 0.0 || 13.1 || 4.4 || 17.5 || 4.1 || 
|- style="background:#eaeaea;"
! scope="row" style="text-align:center" | 1981
|style="text-align:center;"|
| 9 || 22 || 0 || 0 || 255 || 85 || 340 || 72 ||  || 0.0 || 0.0 || 11.6 || 3.9 || 15.5 || 3.3 || 
|- class="sortbottom"
! colspan=3| Career
! 189
! 25
! 29
! 2388
! 499
! 2887
! 672
! 
! 0.1
! 0.2
! 12.7
! 2.6
! 15.4
! 3.6
! 
|}

References

External links

 Profile at Demonwiki

1951 births
Living people
Australian rules footballers from Victoria (Australia)
Richmond Football Club players
Richmond Football Club Premiership players
Melbourne Football Club players
Keith 'Bluey' Truscott Trophy winners
Casey Demons players
Casey Demons coaches
Waverley Football Club players
One-time VFL/AFL Premiership players